Ricardo "Dick" Burzi was an Argentinian automotive designer, best known for his work with the Austin Motor Company in Birmingham, England.

Burzi was born in Buenos Aires, the capital of Argentina, to a French mother. By 1929 he was working in Italy for Lancia, but was forced to leave after drawing cartoons belittling Benito Mussolini that were published in several newspapers. Lancia initially moved Burzi to their coachbuilding firm in Paris, but he was recruited by Lord Austin in 1929 to work at Longbridge in Birmingham after Austin received a recommendation from Vincenzo Lancia, whom he met while travelling on the Queen Mary to the United States.

Burzi arrived at Longbridge speaking no English but was soon known universally as "Dick". His first designs for the Austin 16 were considered too advanced for conservative British tastes by Lord Austin, but in 1938 Burzi was appointed head of styling by the incoming works manager at Longbridge, Leonard Lord. Burzi's Italian background saw him interned on the Isle of Man when Italy entered the Second World War, but he was released in 1943 and started work on designing the Austin A40.

Notable cars designed by Burzi in the post-war era included the Austin A30, the Austin A40, the Austin A70 and the Austin A90.

References

Argentine automobile designers
People interned in the Isle of Man during World War II
Year of death missing
Year of birth missing
British automobile designers